Ottó Dóra (1 June 1962 – 29 November 2015) was a Hungarian politician, who served as mayor of Salgótarján from 12 October 2014 until his death.

He was a member of the Hungarian Socialist Party (MSZP). He functioned as President of the General Assembly of Nógrád County between 2002 and 2006. He died after a short illness on 29 November 2015, aged 53.

References

1962 births
2015 deaths
Mayors of places in Hungary
Hungarian Socialist Party politicians
People from Gödöllő